Ascharya Fuck It (parsed as Ascharya F#*k It on the film's theatrical poster; also known as Ascharyachakit!) is an Indian Hindi language black comedy drama film, directed by Samit Kakkad. The film stars Priyanka Bose, Vaibhav Raj Gupta, Ankit Raaj, Anangsha Biswas and Santosh Juvekar in major roles. The story is about how desire and greed intertwine the lives of a Bollywood star, his chauffeur, a prostitute and her pimp in an unlikely love story. The film is backed by Yoodlee Films, a production venture of Saregama.

Plot 
A Bollywood Superstar hires a prostitute for a night of passion. This one night changes the fate of five characters forever. The prostitute falls for the Superstar's driver while she struggles to free herself from the clutches of the sociopath pimp. Meanwhile, the actor is blackmailed for his past transgressions and he seeks to keep his reputation intact by any means necessary. These two events collide with a violent conclusion where not everyone will survive.

Cast 
 Santosh Juvekar as Khushiya
 Priyanka Bose as Kanta
 Vaibhav Raj Gupta as Raju
 Ankit Raaj as Karan Kumar
 Vipin Sharma as Gordhan
 Anangsha Biswas as Latika
Kashmira Irani as Janki

References

External links 
 

2018 films
2010s Hindi-language films
Indian drama films
Films about Bollywood
Indian black comedy films
Films about prostitution in India
Indian direct-to-video films
2018 direct-to-video films
2018 black comedy films
Hindi-language drama films